Bratolyubovka is a rural locality (a selo) in Chergalinsky Selsoviet of Romnensky District, Amur Oblast, Russia. The population was 102 as of 2018. There are 2 streets.

Geography 
Bratolyubovka is located 14 km northeast of Romny (the district's administrative centre) by road. Romny is the nearest rural locality.

References 

Rural localities in Romnensky District